The Silent Family Silent Racer is a German ultralight trike, designed by Helmut Grossklaus and produced by Silent Family of Westerrade. The aircraft is supplied as a complete ready-to-fly-aircraft.

Design and development
It features a cable-braced hang glider-style high-wing, weight-shift controls, a two-seats-in-tandem open cockpit with a windshield, retractable tricycle landing gear and a single engine in pusher configuration.

The aircraft is made from composites, with its double surface wing covered in Dacron sailcloth. The powerplant is a twin cylinder, air-cooled, two-stroke, dual-ignition  Hirth 2704 engine or  Hirth 2706.

Specifications (Silent Racer)

References

External links
Official website

2000s German sport aircraft
2000s German ultralight aircraft
Homebuilt aircraft
Single-engined pusher aircraft
Ultralight trikes